"Donna con te" is a 1990 song composed by  Danilo Amerio and Luciano Boero  and performed by  Anna Oxa.

Background 
The song premiered at the 40th edition of the Sanremo Music Festival, where it was first supposed to be performed by Patty Pravo; during the rehearsals Pravo complained about the lyrics and asked major changes, and eventually refused to perform the song. After considering several replacements such as Fiordaliso, Lorella Cuccarini and Lina Sastri, Anna Oxa was eventually chosen.

During the festival, the song was also performed in a Portuguese-language adaptation by Kaoma.

Charts

References

 

1990 singles
CBS Records singles
Italian songs
1990 songs
Sanremo Music Festival songs